Irish Hills is an area of land located roughly in southeastern Jackson County and northwest Lenawee County in Southeast Michigan. It was named after the numerous Irish immigrants who settled there from 1830 until 1850.

Today it is known throughout the state for its scenery, especially in the summer. Its hills and larger kettle lakes surround the  Hayes State Park. 

It is also known for its chain of smaller kettle lakes bordered by  US Highway 12 (US 12, Michigan Avenue). These link to Cambridge Junction Historic State Park, which is adjoined by the Michigan International Speedway.

Irish Hills has a number of resorts. It had several family-oriented locations, including an old west theme park known as Stagecoach Stop USA and a mock dinosaur exhibit named Prehistoric Forest, both of which subsequently closed. In 2013, however, Stagecoach Stop was reopened as a resort, and is now called Stagecoach Stop Western Resort. As of 2015, Mystery Hill, a gravity hill, was still in operation.  Attempts are being made to save the observation towers known as the Irish Hills Towers.  The area is home to several family-owned restaurants and bars. There are several places to lodge, mostly located along the lakefront. 

The Michigan International Speedway hosts NASCAR races, attracting about 300,000 fans a year during the racing season of June and August. The  Faster Horses Festival takes place in July in Irish Hills.

Some towns in Irish Hills include Brooklyn, Napoleon, Norvell and Onsted.

See also
Tourism in metropolitan Detroit
Southern Michigan
Southeast Michigan

References

External links
Lenawee County CVB
Lenawee County government site
Complete text of History of Lenawee County published in 1909 by the Western Historical Society
Brooklyn-Irish Hills Chamber of Commerce
Peek Through Time: Irish Hills attractions beckoned tourists to see dinosaurs, wild west, Mother Goose   Mlive.com news, May 23, 2013 Archived 11-18-2015

Geography of Michigan
Geography of Lenawee County, Michigan
Resorts in Michigan
Geography of Jackson County, Michigan
Irish-American neighborhoods
Irish-American culture in Michigan